Seuamuli Fasi Toma (born ~1964) is a Samoan politician. He is a member of the FAST Party.

Seuamuli was born on Savai'i and is a farmer and lay preacher. He was first elected to the Legislative Assembly of Samoa in the 2021 Samoan general election, defeating former Deputy Speaker Nafoitoa Talaimanu Keti. On 28 July 2021 he was appointed Associate Minister of Women, Community and Development.

References

Living people
Members of the Legislative Assembly of Samoa
Faʻatuatua i le Atua Samoa ua Tasi politicians
Year of birth missing (living people)
People from Savai'i